The adenosine receptors (or P1 receptors) are a class of purinergic G protein-coupled receptors with adenosine as the endogenous ligand. There are four known types of adenosine receptors in humans: A1, A2A, A2B and A3; each is encoded by a different gene.

The adenosine receptors are commonly known for their antagonists caffeine, theobromine, and theophylline, whose action on the receptors produces the stimulating effects of coffee, tea and chocolate.

Pharmacology

Each type of adenosine receptor has different functions, although with some overlap. For instance, both A1 receptors and A2A play roles in the heart, regulating myocardial oxygen consumption and coronary blood flow, while the A2A receptor also has broader anti-inflammatory effects throughout the body. These two receptors also have important roles in the brain, regulating the release of other neurotransmitters such as dopamine and glutamate, while the A2B and A3 receptors are located mainly peripherally and are involved in processes such as inflammation and immune responses.

Most older compounds acting on adenosine receptors are nonselective, with the endogenous agonist adenosine being used in hospitals as treatment for severe tachycardia (rapid heart beat), and acting directly to slow the heart through action on all four adenosine receptors in heart tissue, as well as producing a sedative effect through action on A1 and A2A receptors in the brain. Xanthine derivatives such as caffeine and theophylline act as non-selective antagonists at A1 and A2A receptors in both heart and brain and so have the opposite effect to adenosine, producing a stimulant effect and rapid heart rate. These compounds also act as phosphodiesterase inhibitors, which produces additional anti-inflammatory effects, and makes them medically useful for the treatment of conditions such as asthma, but less suitable for use in scientific research.

Newer adenosine receptor agonists and antagonists are much more potent and subtype-selective, and have allowed extensive research into the effects of blocking or stimulating the individual adenosine receptor subtypes, which is now resulting in a new generation of more selective drugs with many potential medical uses. Some of these compounds are still derived from adenosine or from the xanthine family, but researchers in this area have also discovered many selective adenosine receptor ligands that are entirely structurally distinct, giving a wide range of possible directions for future research.

Subtypes

Comparison

A1 adenosine receptor

The adenosine A1 receptor has been found to be ubiquitous throughout the entire body.

Mechanism
This receptor has an inhibitory function on most of the tissues in which it is expressed. In the brain, it slows metabolic activity by a combination of actions. Presynaptically, it reduces synaptic vesicle release while post synaptically it has been found to stabilize the magnesium on the NMDA receptor.

Antagonism and agonism
Specific A1 antagonists include 8-Cyclopentyl-1,3-dipropylxanthine (DPCPX), and Cyclopentyltheophylline (CPT) or 8-cyclopentyl-1,3-dipropylxanthine (CPX), while specific agonists include 2-chloro-N(6)-cyclopentyladenosine (CCPA).

Tecadenoson is an effective A1 adenosine agonist, as is selodenoson.

In the heart
The A1, together with A2A receptors of endogenous adenosine play a role in regulating myocardial oxygen consumption and coronary blood flow. Stimulation of the A1 receptor has a myocardial depressant effect by decreasing the conduction of electrical impulses and suppressing pacemaker cell function, resulting in a decrease in heart rate. This makes adenosine a useful medication for treating and diagnosing tachyarrhythmias, or excessively fast heart rates. This effect on the A1 receptor also explains why there is a brief moment of cardiac standstill when adenosine is administered as a rapid IV push during cardiac resuscitation. The rapid infusion causes a momentary myocardial stunning effect.

In normal physiological states, this serves as a protective mechanism. However, in altered cardiac function, such as hypoperfusion caused by hypotension, heart attack or cardiac arrest caused by nonperfusing bradycardias, adenosine has a negative effect on physiological functioning by preventing necessary compensatory increases in heart rate and blood pressure that attempt to maintain cerebral perfusion.

In neonatal medicine
Adenosine antagonists are widely used in neonatal medicine;

A reduction in A1 expression appears to prevent hypoxia-induced ventriculomegaly and loss of white matter, which raises the possibility that pharmacological blockade of A1 may have clinical utility.

Theophylline and caffeine are nonselective adenosine antagonists that are used to stimulate respiration in premature infants.

Bone homeostasis
Adenosine receptors play a key role in the homeostasis of bone. The A1 receptor has been shown to stimulate osteoclast differentiation and function. Studies have found that blockade of the A1 Receptor suppresses the osteoclast function, leading to increased bone density.

A2A adenosine receptor

As with the A1, the A2A receptors are believed to play a role in regulating myocardial oxygen consumption and coronary blood flow.

Mechanism
The activity of A2A adenosine receptor, a G-protein coupled receptor family member, is mediated by G proteins that activate adenylyl cyclase. It is abundant in basal ganglia, vasculature and platelets and it is a major target of caffeine.

Function
The A2A receptor is responsible for regulating myocardial blood flow by vasodilating the coronary arteries, which increases blood flow to the myocardium, but may lead to hypotension. Just as in A1 receptors, this normally serves as a protective mechanism, but may be destructive in altered cardiac function.

Agonists and antagonists
Specific antagonists include istradefylline (KW-6002) and SCH-58261, while specific agonists include CGS-21680 and ATL-146e.

Bone homeostasis
The role of A2A receptor opposes that of A1 in that it inhibits osteoclast differentiation and activates osteoblasts. Studies have shown it to be effective in decreasing inflammatory osteolysis in inflamed bone. This role could potentiate new therapeutic treatment in aid of bone regeneration and increasing bone volume.

A2B adenosine receptor

This integral membrane protein stimulates adenylate cyclase activity in the presence of adenosine. This protein also interacts with netrin-1, which is involved in axon elongation.

Bone homeostasis
Similarly to A2A receptor, the A2B receptor promotes osteoblast differentiation. The osteoblast cell is derived from the Mesenchymal Stem Cell (MSC) which can also differentiate into a chondrocyte. The cell signalling involved in the stimulation of the A2B receptor directs the route of differentiation to osteoblast, rather than chondrocyte via the Runx2 gene expression. Potential therapeutic application in aiding bone degenerative diseases, age related changes as well as injury repair.

A3 adenosine receptor

It has been shown in studies to inhibit some specific signal pathways of adenosine. It allows for the inhibition of growth in human melanoma cells. Specific antagonists include MRS1191, MRS1523 and MRE3008F20, while specific agonists include Cl-IB-MECA and MRS3558.

Bone homeostasis
The role of A3 receptor is less defined in this field. Studies have shown that it plays a role in the downregulation of osteoclasts. Its function in regards to osteoblasts remains ambiguous.

References

External links
 

G protein-coupled receptors